The French East India Company was a joint-stock company founded in France on 1 September 1664 to compete with the English (later British) and Dutch trading companies in the East Indies. Planned by Jean-Baptiste Colbert, it was chartered by King Louis XIV for the purpose of trading in the Eastern Hemisphere. It resulted from the fusion of three earlier companies, the 1660 Compagnie de Chine, the Compagnie d'Orient and Compagnie de Madagascar. The first Director General for the Company was François de la Faye, who was adjoined by two Directors belonging to the two most successful trading organizations at that time: François Caron, who had spent 30 years working for the Dutch East India Company, including more than 20 years in Japan, and Marcara Avanchintz, an Armenian trader from Isfahan, Persia.

History

In 1604, King Henry IV of France authorized the establishment of the Compagnie des Indes Orientales (East India Company), granting the new firm a 15-year monopoly on French trade with the East Indies. This company was a precursor to a firm of the same name founded Jean-Baptiste Colbert, though the first business was not a joint-stock company, and was funded by the French Crown. The seventeenth century saw several French efforts to trade with the East Indies. They were influenced by the successful business ventures of the Dutch East India Company. Between the 1630s and early 1660s, French efforts were smaller in scale, but they enjoyed some success. French merchant ships traversed the Persian Gulf, Red Sea, and the northwestern coast of the Indian subcontinent. These accomplishments paled France in comparison with England and Dutch Republic. France's Atlantic ports pursued to compete and amalgamate with each other. The commercial and capital expertise was disbursed around the coastal regions of Brittany and Normandy.

The initial capital of the revamped Compagnie des Indes Orientales was 15 million livres, divided into shares of 1000 livres apiece. Louis XIV funded the first 3 million livres of investment, against which losses in the first 10 years were to be charged. The initial stock offering quickly sold out, as courtiers of Louis XIV recognized that it was in their interests to support the King's overseas initiative. The Compagnie des Indes Orientales was granted a 50-year monopoly on French trade in the Indian and Pacific Oceans, a region stretching from the Cape of Good Hope to the Straits of Magellan. The French monarch also granted the company a concession in perpetuity for the island of Madagascar, as well as any other territories it could conquer. The company possessed greater resources and better political banking than France's previous ventures in the Indian Ocean. Colbert's obsession with VOC led to series of early letdowns. One of France's main aims was to establish a French entrepôt in Madagascar to rival the Dutch colony of Batavia.

By the 1680s, the company went insolvent and they had little choice but to rent out its monopoly to a group of merchants. The Indian trade remained under the company for approximately thirty years. In 1716, Scottish financier John Law arrived at the French royal court. The French court were in deep misery and were impotent to cover their debts caused due to War of Spanish Succession. Law approached the Crown with a scheme to construct a national bank and introduce paper currency, which would facilitate France's shift to credit economy. The company failed to found a successful colony on Madagascar, but was able to establish ports on the nearby islands of Bourbon and Île-de-France (today's Réunion and Mauritius). By 1719, it had established itself in India, but the firm was near bankruptcy. In the same year the Compagnie des Indes Orientales was merged under Law's direction with other French trading companies to form the Compagnie Perpétuelle des Indes. This merger resulted in the company being involved in importing slaves to Louisiana, as the colony operated on a plantation economy. The French economy crashed drastically in 1721 due to Law's reforms. Following this event, the company again started trading and settling in India. The reorganized corporation resumed its operating independence in 1723.

The company's interest in the Mughal Empire was to prove no easier. The French arrived at the Indian subcontinent decades after the English, Portuguese and Dutch in establishing trade in India. On 4 September 1666, the French secured a royal mandate from Emperor Aurangzeb that granted them to trade on the port of Surat. By 1683, the French had directed their attention toward the prominent site of Pondicherry, however the shift did little to offset the company's chronic shortage of capital. By 1738, the company owned 1,432 slaves, 630 of whom resided in the French colony of Isle de France. Many slaves in the colony were imported by the company from the West African region of Senegambia; these included laptots, African slaves who forcibly served onboard the company's ships. With the decline of the Mughal Empire, the French decided to intervene in Indian political affairs to protect their interests, notably by forging alliances with local rulers in south India. From 1741 the French under Joseph François Dupleix pursued an aggressive policy against both the Indians and the British until they ultimately were defeated by Robert Clive. Several Indian trading ports, including Pondichéry and Chandernagore, remained under French control until 1954.

France's main rivalry came from the British. As a result of constant wars in Europe, notably the War of the Austrian Succession and the Seven Years' War the British were able to exert control over French territories in India. With the Treaty of Paris in 1763, the territories were returned to France. The company was not able to maintain itself financially, and it was abolished in 1769. King Louis XV issued a 1769 edict that required the company to transfer to the state all its properties, assets and rights, which were valued at 30 million livres. The King agreed to pay all of the company's debts and obligations, though holders of company stock and notes received only an estimated 15 percent of the face value of their investments by the end of corporate liquidation in 1790.

The company was reconstituted in 1785 and issued 40,000 shares of stock, priced at 1,000 livres apiece. It was given monopoly on all trade with countries beyond the Cape of Good Hope for an agreed period of seven years. The agreement, however, did not anticipate the French Revolution, and on 3 April 1790 the monopoly was abolished by an act of the new French Assembly which enthusiastically declared that the lucrative Far Eastern trade would henceforth be "thrown open to all Frenchmen". The company, accustomed neither to competition nor official disfavor, fell into steady decline and was finally liquidated in 1794.

Map gallery

Liquidation scandal
Even as the company was headed consciously toward extinction, it became embroiled in its most infamous scandal. The Committee of Public Safety had banned all joint-stock companies on 24 August 1793, and specifically seized the assets and papers of the East India Company. While its liquidation proceedings were being set up, directors of the company bribed various senior state officials to allow the company to carry out its own liquidation, rather than be supervised by the government. When this became known the following year, the resulting scandal led to the execution of key Montagnard deputies like Fabre d'Églantine and Joseph Delaunay, among others. The infighting sparked by the episode also brought down Georges Danton and can be said to have led to the downfall of the Montagnards as a whole.

Coins

See also 

 British East India Company, founded in 1600
 Portuguese East India Company, founded 1628
 Carnatic Wars
 Chanda Sahib
 Dutch East India Company, founded in 1602
 Dutch West India Company, founded in 1621
 European chartered companies founded around the 17th century (in French)
 France-Asia relations
 French colonial empire
 French India
 List of trading companies
 Lorient
 Muzaffar Jang
 Salabat Jang
 Swedish East India Company, founded in 1731
 Whampoa anchorage

Notes

Further reading

Greenwald, Erin M. (2016). Marc-Antoine Caillot and the Company of the Indies in Louisiana: Trade in the French Atlantic World. Baton Rouge: Louisiana State University Press.

External links 
 Museum of the French East India Company at Lorient
 The French East India Company (1785–1875) History of the last French East India Company on the site dedicated to its business lawyer Jean-Jacques Regis of Cambaceres.
 French East Indies Company nowadays
Frenchbooksonindia.com, an open access multilingual discovery tool with book data from 1531 to 2020, full-text ebooks from 1531 to 1937 and in-text search from c. 1830 to c. 1920

 
Yanam
Colonial Indian companies
1664 establishments in France
Companies established in 1664
1769 disestablishments in France
Companies disestablished in 1769
Trading companies of France
1785 establishments in France
1794 disestablishments in France
1794 disestablishments in French India
French companies established in 1785